The Grand Site is an archaeological site in Jacksonville, Florida, United States. The site includes a shell midden about 30 feet wide and 175 feet in diameter, with a sand mound immediately to the west. It is a product of the St. Johns archaeological culture spanning the St. Johns IIA through IIB periods. On June 20, 1975, it was added to the U.S. National Register of Historic Places.

References

National Register of Historic Places in Jacksonville, Florida
Southbank, Jacksonville